Statistics of North American Soccer League in season 1977. This was the 10th season of the NASL.

Overview
The league was made up of 18 teams. The schedule was expanded to 26 games and the playoffs to 12 teams. Team rosters consisted of 17 players, 6 of which had to be U.S. or Canadian citizens. The NASL began using its own variation of the penalty shoot-out procedure for tied matches. Matches tied at the end of regulation would now go to a golden goal overtime period and, if still tied, on to a shoot-out. Instead of penalty kicks however, the shoot-out attempt started 35 yards from the goal and allowed the player 5 seconds to attempt a shot. The player could make as many moves as he wanted in a breakaway situation within the time frame. NASL procedure also called for the box score or score-line to show an additional "goal" given to the winning side of a shoot-out. This "victory goal" however was not credited in the "Goals For" column of the league table. The Cosmos defeated the Seattle Sounders in the finals on August 28 to win the championship.

Changes from the previous season

New teams
None

Teams folding
Boston Minutemen
Philadelphia Atoms

Teams moving
Miami Toros - Fort Lauderdale Strikers
San Antonio Thunder - Team Hawaii
San Diego Jaws - Las Vegas Quicksilvers

Name changes
Hartford Bicentennials to Connecticut Bicentennials
Cosmos drop "New York" from name

Regular season
W = Wins, L = Losses, GF = Goals For, GA = Goals Against, BP = Bonus Points, Pts= point system

6 points for a win, 0 points for a loss, 1 point for each regulation goal scored up to three per game.
-Premiers (most points). -Other playoff teams.

Atlantic Conference

Pacific Conference

NASL All-Stars

Playoffs

The first round and the Soccer Bowl were single game match ups, while the conference semifinals and championships were all two-game series.

Bracket

First round

Division Championships
*Minnesota Kicks hosted Game 1 (instead of Game 2) due to a scheduling conflict with the Twins baseball club.

Conference Championships
#Seattle Sounders hosted Game 2 (instead of Game 1) due to a scheduling conflict with the Mariners baseball club.

Soccer Bowl '77

1977 NASL Champions: Cosmos

Post season awards
Most Valuable Player: Franz Beckenbauer, Cosmos
Coach of the year: Ron Newman, Fort Lauderdale
Rookie of the year: Jim McAlister, Seattle

References

External links
The Year in American Soccer – 1977
Chris Page's NASL Archive
Complete Results and Standings

 
North American Soccer League (1968–1984) seasons
1977
1977 in Canadian soccer